Glenn Nevens (born 8 February 1990) is a Belgian footballer who currently plays for Lommel in the Belgian First Division B as a centre-back.

External links

1990 births
Living people
Belgian footballers
Lommel S.K. players
Challenger Pro League players
Association football central defenders
People from Tongeren
Footballers from Limburg (Belgium)